Abysmal Dawn is an American death metal band from Los Angeles, California.

Band history 
Abysmal Dawn was formed by Charles Elliott (guitars/vocals), Jamie Boulanger (guitars), and Terry Barajas (drums) who circulated a three-song demo in winter 2004. The demo garnered some attention for the band within the underground metal press circuit as well as helped them score gigs alongside Exodus, 3 Inches of Blood, Hate Eternal, Into Eternity and Aborted.

In November 2005, the band began work on what would become their first proper full-length From Ashes with engineer John Haddad (Intronaut, Eyes of Fire, Phobia). The resulting nine songs paid special attention to not only brutality, but song craft as well and earned the band a remarkable international press response for a debut album. On the strength of From Ashes, they earned their first U.S. tour, a five-week juggernaut alongside Six Feet Under and Decapitated and played as support throughout their home state with the likes of Suffocation, Emperor, Immortal, Goatwhore and Decrepit Birth.

In 2007, Abysmal Dawn played a handful of festivals (LA Murderfest, Gathering of the Sick, Burning Star Metal Fest, and more) but most of the band's time was devoted to writing and rehearsing new material for their follow-up to From Ashes. By November, Abysmal Dawn had entered Haddad's new studio to begin the next full-length.

Abysmal Dawn spent the next three-months in and out of the studio crafting Programmed to Consume. One by one, track by track, the pieces of this record came together, including brand new artwork once again from Par Olofsson. In February 2008, Abysmal Dawn signed a deal with Relapse Records, making Programmed to Consume the band's label debut. Abysmal Dawn released this album on May 13 (May 19 internationally).

After three years passed since the release Leveling the Plane of Existence they finally released their fourth studio album Obsolescence on October 28, 2014, via Relapse Records. According to Abysmal Dawn's frontman Charles Elliott, the title of the album was "inspired by the term 'planned obsolescence', and is applied to all of mankind. In business terms, it means to manufacture a product that's made to break down after a certain amount of time so that it can be replaced". The Village Voice has rated the latest album number one and called it "The closest thing to a perfect metal album that you will hear this year."

Abysmal Dawn released their fifth studio album entitled Phylogenesis, through Season of Mist Records, which was released on April 17, 2020.

Band members 
Current members
Charles Elliott – guitars, lead vocals (2003–present)
Eliseo Garcia – bass, backing vocals (2011–present)
James Coppolino – drums (2016–present)
Vito Petroni – guitars (2017–present)

Former members
Jamie Boulanger – guitars (2003–2008)
Terry Barajas – drums (2003–2009)
Mike Bear – session bass (2005)
Carlos Arriola – bass (2006–2007)
Ian Jekelis – guitars (2008–2010)
Mike Cosio – bass (2007–2011)
Andy Nelson – guitars (2008–2015)
Scott Fuller – drums (2010–2015)
Allan Marcus – guitars (2016)

Discography

Studio albums

EPs

Demos 
 Demo (2004)

Music videos 
 "Programmed to Consume" (2008)
 "My Own Savior" (2011)
 "In Service of Time" (2013)
 "Inanimate" (2014)

References

External links 
Official website
Abysmal Dawn on Relapse Records

2003 establishments in California
Death metal musical groups from California
Musical groups established in 2003
Musical groups from Los Angeles
Musical quartets